Vilsonovo Šetalište is a promenade in Sarajevo, Bosnia and Herzegovina. It is an important street for the city, however, in the afternoon hours and during weekend the traffic restriction is in force, and the promenade becomes recreational area. The lane also bears a historical significance. It was conceived during the Austro-Hungarian era. 

Wilson's Promenade was named after the former president of the United States, Woodrow Wilson. There are 480 linden and chestnut trees. The lane is frequently visited not just by people living to its close proximity, but also by people from all over the city as well as tourists.

References

External links

Vilsonovo.net - raja su uvijek raja, photo album and blog maintained by local residents and ex-residents

Populated places in Centar, Sarajevo
Neighbourhoods in Grad Sarajevo
Streets in Sarajevo